Class 380 may refer to:

British Rail Class 380
ČD Class 380
China Railways CRH380A
FS Class E.380
LNWR 380 Class
LSWR 380 class